My Generation is a 2017 documentary film directed by David Batty and presented by Sir Michael Caine. It follows the cultural revolution that occurred in 1960s England and interviews various icons and key figures such as David Bailey, Roger Daltrey, Marianne Faithfull, Paul McCartney, Mary Quant and Twiggy. The film contains an abundance of archive footage and its soundtrack contains the 1965 song of the same name by The Who.

References 

2017 films
2017 documentary films
Films produced by Fodhla Cronin O'Reilly
Films with screenplays by Dick Clement
Films with screenplays by Ian La Frenais
2010s English-language films
2010s British films